Hanting is an urban district of the city of Weifang, Shandong province, China, bordering the Laizhou Bay in its far north.

Administrative divisions
As 2012, this district is divided to 7 subdistricts.
Subdistricts

References

External links 
 Official homepage

County-level divisions of Shandong
Weifang